Chinese red pine is a common name for several species of pine and may refer to:

 Pinus massoniana
 Pinus tabuliformis